Kadhal Kasakuthaiya is a 2017 Indian Tamil-language romantic drama film written and directed by Dwarakh Raja. Featuring Dhruvva and Venba in the lead roles, the film also has veteran actors Charle and Kalpana in pivotal roles. The film began production during mid-2016 and was released on 8 September 2017 to mixed reviews from critics.

Plot
The film begins with Diya, a seventeen-year-old girl, studying in high school. Diya is the only child for her parents. Diya's father is very fond of her. Diya goes to school by cycle with her friend Patricia. Arjun is a twenty-five-year-old software engineer. He lives in Diya's apartment. Diya sees Arjun and is impressed. Diya gets Arjun's number and calls him. Diya asks Arjun to meet him. Arjun agrees to her. Arjun gets shocked when he sees Diya. A short school-going girl comes and proposes to him. After a few days, they meet again. Arjun is impressed and proposes to her. Arjun's friends scold him for having an affair with a schoolgirl. A schoolboy who has a crush on Diya learns about Arjun-Diya's love. The schoolboy is angered. One day Arjun buys a new dress for Diya. He calls Diya to come to his home and try the new dress. After school, Diya goes to Arjun's house. While Diya is in Arjun's house the schoolboy calls Diya’s father and tells him that Diya is in Arjun's house. Diya's father comes to Arjun's house and is angered to see Diya there. Diya's father scold her. Arjun leaves the town and leaves for another place. Diya is heartbroken. Patricia asks to Arjun's friends about Arjun. They said that they didn't know where he went. After a few days, Arjun's mother wakes up from coma. Diya couldn't do anything except thinking of Arjun. Arjun's mother learns of her son's affair with Diya. She agrees to his love. Arjun's mother says that it is not a problem to love a young girl and says that she was Diya's age when she got married.

Then Diya and Arjun doesn't meet each other. After few days, Diya faces the Public examination so she focused and concentrated only in studies. Here Arjun realizes that him and Diya's love and bonding, he started loving Diya. He meets Diya and proposes her also he wishes her to do all exams well, She accepted him. Here exams are over, Diya wrote very well in all the exams. Then she completed her school life and entered college. There Arjun and Diya loves each other.

After marry years, Diya and Arjun got married in front of their families.

Cast
 Dhruvva as Arjun
 Venba as Diya
 Charle as Diya's father
 Kalpana as Arjun's mother
 Deepa Nethran as Diya's mother
 Vaishali Taniga as Patricia
 Linga as Vivek
 Jayaganesh
 Shivam
 Navin Gj

Production
The film's director, Dwarakh, a visual communication graduate who has made short films, stated "the film which he says cannot be classified under a particular genre" and that "the story revolves around the romance between an 18-year-old girl and a 25-year-old boy". The film had its origin as a short film titled Maalai Neram, but Dwarakh later expanded that into a film. Dhruvva of Thilagar (2015) fame and Venba, who portrayed the younger version of Anjali's character in Kattradhu Thamizh (2007), were signed to play the lead pair. Dwarakh completed scripting the film in a mere 10 days, and wrapped up the shoot in 24 days.

Soundtrack

The film's music was composed by Dharan Kumar, while the audio rights of the film was acquired by Music 247. The album released on 23 August 2017 and featured six tracks.

Release
The film opened on 8 September 2017 to mixed reviews, with the critic from The Times of India giving the film a negative review and stating "the writing seems unable to maintain a rhythm resulting in an uneven film that is engaging only in bit and parts". The film was later dubbed and released in Telugu as Heart Beat on 19 January 2018.

References

External links
 

2017 films
2010s Tamil-language films
Films set in Chennai
Films shot in Chennai
2017 directorial debut films
Films scored by Dharan Kumar